Diaulula sandiegensis is a species of sea slug, a dorid nudibranch, a shell-less marine gastropod mollusc in the family Discodorididae.

The specific epithet sandiegensis means: "of San Diego", the Southern California city.

Distribution
This dorid nudibranch occurs in the eastern Pacific, from Barkley Sound, British Columbia to Baja California, Mexico. It has been confused with Diaulula boreopacifica which has a more northerly range and also occurs in Japan and Russia.

Description
This nudibranch grows to about 100 mm (4") in length. The background color can be white or any shade of yellow to a yellowish brown, and it has characteristic markings consisting of a few brown rings or irregular spots. Specimens with more numerous spots are Diaulula odonoghuei.

Life habits
This species feeds on sponges.

References

Discodorididae
Gastropods described in 1862
Taxa named by James Graham Cooper